James Charles Dacre (born May 1984) is a British theatre director. He has been artistic director of Royal & Derngate Theatres in Northampton since 2013.

Early years
James Dacre was born in 1984, the son of Paul Dacre, former editor of the Daily Mail. He won a King's Scholarship to Eton where he won the Newcastle Scholarship. He then studied Theology, Religion and Philosophy of Religion at Jesus College, Cambridge where he edited Varsity, the student newspaper and directed at the ADC, taking several productions to the Edinburgh Festival. On graduating, he won a Fulbright Scholarship and Shubert Fellowship to study Theatre Directing at Columbia University School of the Arts in New York. Dacre then worked as an assistant director to twelve directors including Anne Bogart, Robert Woodruff and Silviu Purcărete, and trained on the ITV/Channel 4 regional theatre director scheme at the New Vic Theatre in Stoke-on-Trent.

Career
On returning from America, Dacre directed and produced The Mountaintop, which transferred to the West End and went on to become the surprise winner of the 2010 Olivier Award for Best New Play. Subsequently, he became Associate Director at the New Vic Theatre and Theatre503 and directed in the West End and at Shakespeare's Globe, Royal Exchange Theatre, Royal National Theatre and many regional theatres before taking up his current role at Royal & Derngate.

In 2015, Royal & Derngate won the UK Theatre Award for Best Presentation of Touring Theatre, for an ambitious season of productions staged nationwide, including the world premiere of Arthur Miller's The Hook produced to mark the centenary of his birth and Shakespeare's King John staged at Shakespeare's Globe, Salisbury Cathedral, Temple Church and The Holy Sepulchre to celebrate the 800th anniversary of the signing of Magna Carta.

In 2016, Royal & Derngate was shortlisted for The Stage's Regional Theatre of the Year Award, having reached more than half a million audiences across the UK and toured to over 65 theatres that year. Also in 2016, Dacre's production of The Herbal Bed won Best Touring Production at the UK Theatre Awards.

Selected work
 King John by William Shakespeare (Royal & Derngate, Shakespeare's Globe, Temple Church, Salisbury Cathedral and UK Tour to mark the 800th Anniversary of the Magna Carta), 2015 UK Theatre Award for Best Presentation of Touring Theatre 
 The Herbal Bed by Peter Whelan (Royal & Derngate, English Touring Theatre, Rose Theatre Kingston), 2016 UK Theatre Award for Best Touring Production 
 World Premiere of The Mountaintop by Katori Hall (Trafalgar Studios), 2010 Olivier Award for Best New Play, nominated for a further five Olivier, Whatsonstage and Evening Standard Awards
 World Premiere of Aldous Huxley's Brave New World, adapted by Dawn King, composed by These New Puritans, (Royal & Derngate and National Tour)
 World Premiere of Roy Williams' Soul, (Royal & Derngate and Hackney Empire)
 World Premiere of Arthur Miller's The Hook, (Royal & Derngate and Everyman Theatre)
 As You Like It by William Shakespeare (Shakespeare's Globe, UK and European Tour and 2012 revival)
 King James Bible (Royal National Theatre)
 Premiere of Holy Warriors by David Eldridge (Shakespeare's Globe)
 The Accrington Pals by Peter Whelan (Royal Exchange Theatre), 2013 TMA Award for Best Design Team 
 Cat on a Hot Tin Roof by Tennessee Williams (Royal & Derngate and Royal Exchange Theatre) and Northern Stage, with original music by White Lies
 Premiere of A Tale of Two Cities adapted by Mike Poulton, composed by Rachel Portman, (Royal & Derngate and UK Tour) 2014 TMA nomination for Best Design Team. 
 European premiere of The Body of an American by Dan O'Brien (Gate Theatre) and (Royal & Derngate), nominated for an Evening Standard Award
 Premiere of The Thrill of Love by Amanda Whittington (New Vic Theatre and Stephen Joseph Theatre) before transferring to St. James Theatre, finalist for the 2013 Writers Guild Best New Play Award.
 Premiere of Judgement Day by Mike Poulton, after When We Dead Awaken by Henrik Ibsen (The Print Room), Ian Charleson Best Actress Commendation
 European premiere of 4000 Miles by Amy Herzog (Bath Theatre Royal) and (The Print Room), 2013 Pulitzer Prize Finalist
 Bus Stop by William Inge (New Vic Theatre and Stephen Joseph Theatre)
 Premiere of Precious Little Talent by Ella Hickson (Trafalgar Studios), Best Play, London Theatre Festival Awards 2011, nominated for an Evening Standard Award
 Co-Directed premiere of The Unconquered by Torben Betts (Stellar Quines Theatre Company, UK Tour and Off-Broadway Transfer)
 Desire Under the Elms by Eugene O'Neill (New Vic Theatre)
 Premiere of Orpheus and Eurydice: A Myth Underground in a new adaptation by Molly Davies with music by James Johnston, Nick Cave and the Bad Seeds (National Youth Theatre / Old Vic Tunnels)
 Premiere of The Error of Their Ways by Torben Betts (HERE Arts Centre, New York)
 Copenhagen by Michael Frayn (New Vic Theatre)
 Baal by Bertolt Brecht (Riverside Church, New York)
 Broken (An adaptation of Ernst Toller's Hinkemann by Torben Betts, 2012)
 Orpheus in the Underworld by Jacques Offenbach (Cambridge Arts Theatre)
 Premiere of PMQ by Ella Hickson (Theatre503 and HighTide)

References

External links
 Personal website
 The Independent
 Fulbright Commission

1984 births
Living people
English theatre directors
English artistic directors
People educated at Eton College
Alumni of Jesus College, Cambridge
Columbia University School of the Arts alumni
James